Luidja is a village in Hiiumaa Parish, Hiiu County, on the island of Hiiumaa in Estonia. It is located on the northern coast of the beginning of Kõpu Peninsula, by the Luidja Bay. As of 2011 Census, the village's population was 34.

Luidja is the site of one of the most popular beaches on Hiiumaa. Another main sight is Luidja alder forest which was planted 1901–1903 as an experiment to fixate unique sand dunes. There's a memorial stone to Karl Friedrich Vilhelm Ahrens (1855–1938), the executer of the project.

References

Villages in Hiiu County